Filippo Maria Fanti, known as Irama, (born 20 December 1995) is an Italian singer, rapper and songwriter.

He rose to fame in 2018, following his win on the 17th edition of the talent show Amici di Maria De Filippi. He participated at the Sanremo Music Festival in 2016 with the song "Cosa resterà", in 2019 with "La ragazza con il cuore di latta", in 2021 with "La genesi del tuo colore", and in 2022 with "Ovunque sarai".

Since his debut, he has sold over two million copies in Italy, twice topping the Italian Albums Chart and realizing several media successful singles, including multi-platinum singles "Mediterranea", "Nera" and "La genesi del tuo colore", "Arrogante", "Melodia Proibita", "Crepe", and "La ragazza con il cuore di latta". He has obtained 31 platinum discs and 3 gold discs corresponding to 2 032 000 sales units certified by the FIMI.

Biography and career 
Born in Carrara, where he lived up to primary school, he later moved with his family to Monza. He declared to have been interested in the music of Francesco Guccini and Fabrizio De André since he was a child, and then he approached hip pop. His artistic name, chosen after having anagrammed his second name, Maria, means "rhythm" in Malay.

On November 27, 2015, with the song "Cosa resterà", written with Giulio Nenna, he was among the eight winners of the eighth edition of the Sanremo Giovani song contest, which allowed him to be admitted to the Sanremo Music Festival in the New Proposte category. The single reached the 100th position of the Italian Singles Charts and anticipated the singer's debut studio album, titled Irama, released on February 12, 2016, under the Warner Music Italy label, debuting at the 51st position of the FIMI's Chart. On May 27, 2015, the second single "Tornerai da me" was released and lately certified gold by FIMI. The commercial launch of the single "Mi drogherò" marked the end of the artistic partnership between Irama and Warner Music Italy, due to the low promotion that the label reserved to the songwriter.

At the end of 2016, in search of a record relaunch, Irama decided to participate in the seventeenth edition of the talent show Amici di Maria De Filippi. After the victory of the program, he signed again the contract with Warner Records, releasing the single "Un giorno in più", debuting at position 24 of the FIMI ranking and obtaining the gold certification. The second single "Nera", also performed during the television show, was launched as a single on June 1, achieving the second position of the Top Singles Chart, solding over 150,000 copies. In the same month he published the EP, produced by Giulio Nenna and Andrea Debernardi, entitled Plume, which reached the top of the FIMI Album ranking and was certified double platinum for having sold over 100,000 copies. Plume ranked second in the Italian year end chart for albums/compilations while Nera ranked sixth in singles.

On October 19, 2018, just four months after the previous recording project, the second studio album by the singer-songwriter entitled Giovani, which debuted at the top of the FIMI Albums Chart and was lately certified Platinum. The album was supported by the commercial launch of the single "Bella e rovinata", which reached twenty-first place in the Top Singles.  In January 2019, his participation in the Sanremo Music Festival was announced with the song "La ragazza con il cuore di latta", which peaked at number three of FIMI's chart and sold over 100,000 copies.  On 3 June 2019 the single "Arrogante", written by Federica Abbate, was released. It became the singer's third Top10 single on the Italian charts and also sold 100,000 copies.

On March 27, 2020, the new single "Milano" was  published, with the participation of Francesco Sarcina, frontman of the group Le Vibrazioni. In May 2020 Irama was cast for the spin-off Amici Speciali with other Amici's previous contestant, including Giordana Angi, The Kolors, Gaia and Alberto Urso and eventually won the contest for the second time. On May 19, 2020, he released "Mediterranea" as the lead single of his fourth studio album Crepe. Both the single and the album debuted at number one of FIMI's charts earning his first number one and most successful single as to date. Mediterranea ranked third in the Italian year end chart in 2020.

Sanremo 2021 was a highly memorable experience for the singer/songwriter as he was not able to perform his entry "La genesi del tuo colore" live. A member of his team was tested positive for COVID-19 right before the show and he was forced to undergo a 10-day quarantine despite the negative test results. However, RAI allowed him to pursue in the competition using his rehearsal footage as an alternative. Despite his absence during the live show, his rehearsal recordings still impressed the judges, viewers and fans catapulting him to fifth place in the final ranking. Three weeks later, "La genesi del tuo colore" was certified gold. A year later, he returned to the Sanremo stage with the song "Ovunque Sarai" and finished fourth.

On February 25, 2022, he released his third studio album "Il giorno in cui ho smesso di pensare" which eventually topped the album charts.

Discography

Albums

Extended plays

Singles

As featured artist

Other charted songs

Achievements 
 2016
 Winner of the Summer Festival 2016 quarta edizione del Summer Festival in the Youth section
 Fifth place in the New Proposas section at Festival di Sanremo
 2018
 Winner of the 17th edition of the talent show Amici di Maria De Filippi
 Winner of the Radio 105 award in Amici di Maria De Filippi

 2020
 Winner of Amici speciali

Television

References 

1995 births
Living people
Italian singer-songwriters
21st-century Italian singers
People from Carrara
People from Monza